Lūšna is a lake in Northwest Lithuania, Rokiškis District Municipality, about  south-east of Rokiškis. It is the origin of Nemunėlis River.

Lakes of Lithuania